Patricia Reynolds is emeritus professor of dental education at King's College London. She was formerly a maxillofacial surgeon in the National Health Service and responsible for teaching oral surgery.

References

External links 

British maxillofacial surgeons
Academics of King's College London
British dentists
Women surgeons
Alumni of the Open University
Alumni of the University of London
Physicians of Guy's Hospital
Living people
Year of birth missing (living people)